Geophilus glaber is a species of soil centipede in the family Geophilidae found beneath logs and other debris in California. It grows up to 53 millimeters long, with a discrete frontal plate, large anal pores, and slender feet of the last legs. The female of this species  has 53 or 55 pairs of legs.

References 

glaber
Taxa named by Charles Harvey Bollman
Animals described in 1887
Arthropods of the United States